Geeta Shastri is a politician from Samajwadi Party who is currently Member of Uttar Pradesh Legislative Assembly from Soraon

References

1965 births
Uttar Pradesh MLAs 2022–2027
Samajwadi Party politicians from Uttar Pradesh
Women members of the Uttar Pradesh Legislative Assembly
Living people